Blowzy Weirdos is an album by the British band King of the Slums, released in 1991 on the Cherry Red label.

Track listing 
 "Gone All Weirdo"
 "Smile So Big"
 "Casin' the Joint"
 "Keepin' It All Sweet"
 "Hot Pot Shebeen"
 "Clubland Gangs"
 "Joy"
 "Rimo (F. Rimson)"
 "Mard Arse"
 "Mood On"
 "Blowzy Luv of Life"
 "Casin' the Joint (Rollin')"
 "Gone All Weirdo (Reaper Mix)"
 "Skunkweed Joy"
 "Smiles (Big Smiles Mix)"

References

1991 albums
Cherry Red Records albums
King of the Slums albums